Kibbey is a surname. Notable people with the surname include:

 Ephraim Kibbey (1754/1756–1809), American Revolutionary War soldier
 Ilah Marian Kibbey (1883–1957), American genre and landscape painter
 John Franklin Kibbey (1826-1900), American lawyer and politician
 Joseph Henry Kibbey (1853–1924), American attorney and judge

See also
 Kibbey Canyon, valley in Montana
 Kibbey Formation, subdivision of the Big Snowy Group